Battle Girls: Time Paradox, known in Japan as , is a 2011 Japanese anime television series based on the CR Sengoku Otome pachinko game series developed by Heiwa. Produced by TMS Entertainment under the direction of Hideki Okamoto, the anime series aired on TV Tokyo between April 4, 2011 and June 27, 2011. The series has been licensed in North America by Sentai Filmworks. A video game based on the series, Sengoku Otome: Legend Battle, was released for PlayStation Vita on August 25, 2016.

Plot
Yoshino Hide, an average teenager, finds herself mysteriously transported to a land that appears to be Feudal Japan, albeit in an alternate world entirely made up of females. She ends up encountering the feudal lord, Nobunaga Oda, and helps on her quest to gather the pieces of a Crimson Armor that will help her conquer the land.

Characters
The characters share the names of various historic figures in Feudal Japan, albeit their given names are spelled out in katakana.

 
 
 A ditsy schoolgirl who finds herself transported to an alternate Feudal Japan made up of women. She often brings a lot of modern ethics to this time, including finding uses for her mobile phone despite not being able to get a reception. She is made Oda's retainer after showing skill with a staff. She is nicknamed "Hideyoshi" after Toyotomi Hideyoshi.

 
 
 A feudal lord who desires to gather pieces of a mystical armor to unite the nations. While very short-tempered, aggressive, and overconfident, in the course of the story she becomes more benevolent, considerate and caring under Hideyoshi's influence. She wields a large sword and appears to be able to control flames. She habitually carries around a kiseru given to her by her grandmother Nobubasa as a good luck charm, despite never smoking it.

 
 
 Nobunaga's humble aide, who is often bemused at her acceptance of Hideyoshi's odd behavior and is secretly infatuated with Nobunaga. To this end, she is prepared to do whatever it takes to "make Nobunaga happy", which is why she is willing to acquire the Crimson Armor set on her feudal lord's behalf. Subconsequently, she is also jealous, at times, with Hide's interactions with Nobunaga. She bears a resemblance to one of Hideyoshi's classmates from her time and is often nicknamed  by Hideyoshi due to this likeness. Her weapon of choice is the kunai.

  
 
 A warrior affiliated with Nobunaga and Mitsuhide, who is secretly Hideyoshi's teacher from the present. After witnessing a family member from the distant future arriving before her and then disappearing again, she decided to go back in time to find the Crimson Armor whose legend her descendant had discovered, in order to put Japan's history "on the right track" under the rule of her family.

 
 
 A feudal lord whose primary weapon is a yumi. She owned the left leg of the Crimson Armor but lost it to Nobunaga in a game. She is often bored and considers Nobunaga 'fun'. To her, Tokugawa is nothing short of a cute little sister. In episode 7, she is revealed to be a yuri fan.

 
 
 Yoshimoto's retainer, who wields a priestess staff and magic in battle. Despite appearing to be gentle and obedient, Ieyasu is actually manipulative and also after the Crimson Armor. She bears a resemblance to one of Hideyoshi's classmates and is nicknamed  by Hideyoshi as a result.

 
 
 A feudal general who wields a large fan and controls wind and fire. She owns a section of the Crimson Armor and is friends/rivals with Kenshin. She is rather awkward in expressing herself, and appears to be unaware of the power of the Armor.

 
 
 A feudal lord who wields a spear and utilizes lightning. She owns a section of the Crimson Armor and is friends/rivals with Shingen. She appears to be unaware of the power of the Armor.

 A bespectacled ninja (of many identical ones) who serves Ieyasu.

 A male, slightly lecherous dog which wears a feudal helmet and has the ability to talk, though he only talks around Hideyoshi (and later Ms. Date). He is knowledgeable about the world and time, and the fact Hideyoshi is not from it.

Media

Anime
The anime aired in Japan on TV Tokyo between April 5, 2011 and June 27, 2011 and was simulcast by Crunchyroll. Sentai Filmworks have licensed the series in North America and released it on DVD and Blu-ray Disc on February 26, 2013.

Episode list

Video game
An action video game developed and published by Planet G, titled Sengoku Otome: Legend Battle, was released for the PlayStation Vita on August 25, 2016.

References

External links
 
 

2016 video games
Cultural depictions of Hattori Hanzō
Cultural depictions of Oda Nobunaga
Isekai anime and manga
PlayStation Vita games
PlayStation Vita-only games
Sengoku period in fiction
Sentai Filmworks
TMS Entertainment
TV Tokyo original programming